King's Highway 66, commonly referred to as Highway 66, is a provincially-maintained highway in the Canadian province of Ontario. Located in the Timiskaming District, the highway begins at Matachewan near a junction with Highway 65. At the provincial boundary, the highway continues eastward as Route 117. From Highway 11 ( east of Matachewan) at Kenogami Lake eastwards to the Quebec boundary, Highway66 is designated as part of the Trans-Canada Highway.

Route description 

From there to the community of Kenogami Lake, on Highway11, the highway passes through a  wilderness, encountering few roads or signs of humanity. Instead the highway winds through rock cuts, muskeg and thick coniferous forests. After intersecting Highway11, the route continues east through the controversially-named community of Swastika.
It encounters Highway 112 between Swastika and the community of Chaput Hughes, after which the highway enters the town of Kirkland Lake. East of the town, Highway66 passes through King Kirkland and encounters Highway 672.

Highway66 returns to a remote setting, eventually passing through the community of Larder Lake, where it encounters Highway 624. For the remaining , the route snakes through the wilderness, passing through the communities of Virginiatown and Kearns between long segments of forest. Immediately east of Kearns, the highway crosses the Ontario–Quebec boundary, where it continues as Quebec Route 117 to Rouyn-Noranda.

The entirety of Highway66 is located within Timiskaming District in the rugged and remote Canadian Shield. Outside of the communities along the route, there is almost no habitation or services. Consequently, traffic volumes drop considerably east of Highway11.

History 

Highway66 was first assumed by the Department of Highways on September22, 1937, shortly after its merger with the Department of Northern Development (DND) on April1.
The DND created the road during the early 1930s, connecting several rail stops. The Kirkland Lake area is the site of several gold deposits that were discovered during the first quarter of the century, and the King's Highway status brought about new improvements to help service the mines.
Although several minor realignments to improve the rugged route have been made since then, it did not change significantly between 1956 and 1997. On April1, 1997, a  section of the highway, between Goldthorpe Drive and Main Street, was transferred to the town of Kirkland Lake.

Beginning in August 2011, the Ministry of Transportation of Ontario undertook the Virginiatown Relocation Study to determine a new location around the town and bypass the abandoned Kerr Addison Mine.
Construction was announced in 2015 and was completed sometime before the end of 2017.

Major intersections

See also 
 Golden Highway

References

External links 

Highway 66 pictures and information

Kirkland Lake
066
Ontario 066
Highway 066